Justice Ali Nawaz Chowhan is a Pakistani judge. He started as a district judge in 1977 and was judge of the court of Lahore from 1999 to 2005. From 2006, he was a judge for the Yugoslavia tribunal for three years. He has been a judge for UNESCO since 2010. He was the chief Justice of Gambia from 6 March 2014 until 12 May 2015. He was appointed as first chairman of Pakistan's National Commission on Human Rights (NCHR) in 2015.

Education 
Chowhan studied at the University of Punjab and obtained both a Bachelor of Arts and a Bachelor of Laws there. He also obtained degrees in sharia law and law at three different universities: in Pakistan the International Islamic University in Islamabad and in Saudi Arabia the International Islamic University in Medina and the Umm al-Qura University in Mecca. He also followed several other in-depth studies in Pakistan and the United States, such as in the field of civil service law and the fight against drugs.

References 

Pakistani judges
University of the Punjab alumni
Year of birth missing (living people)
Living people